The Scottish Fire and Rescue Service Museum and Heritage Centre is a museum in Greenock, Inverclyde, Scotland. It is housed in a former fire station and is open to the public on one Sunday a month and on days when cruise ships are in port in Greenock. It is operated by the Scottish Fire Brigades Heritage Trust, a registered charity known from 2013 to 2022 as the Scottish Fire and Rescue Service Heritage Trust.

References

External links

Firefighting museums in the United Kingdom
Emergency services museums in Scotland